Calzadilla de Tera is a municipality located in the province of Zamora, Castile and León, Spain. According to the 2004 census (INE), the municipality has a population of 467 inhabitants.

In the past, it was an important Roman village.

References

Municipalities of the Province of Zamora